Warbrick may refer to:

 Alfred Warbrick (1860–1940), New Zealand rugby union player 
 Arthur Warbrick ( – 1902), New Zealand rugby union player
 Billy Warbrick ( – 1901), New Zealand rugby union player
 Fred Warbrick (1869–1904), New Zealand rugby union player
 Joe Warbrick (1862–1903), New Zealand rugby union player